Bezjak is a South Slavic surname. Notable people with the surname include:

Marko Bezjak (born 1986), Slovenian handball player 
Roman Bezjak (born 1989), Slovenian footballer
Tatiana Bezjak (born 1971), Croatian sculptor and writer
Zvonko Bezjak (born 1935), Croatian hammer thrower

See also
 

Croatian surnames
Slovene-language surnames